Randeep Singh (born 16 November 1990) is an Indian footballer who last played as a midfielder for Minerva Punjab in the I-League.

Career

Early career
Singh started his footballing career in 2002 when he joined Chandigarh Football Academy which is a football academy based in Chandigarh, Punjab, India. He stayed at Chandigarh for 5 years till moving on to SAI East FC Football Academy in Kolkata, West Bengal. He stayed there for only one season when he got signed by famed Indian club Mohun Bagan. After spending one year at Bagan, Singh went back to Punjab to play for the local professional side JCT FC who played in the I-League.

Salgaocar
In the summer of 2011 Singh signed for I-League club Salgaocar S.C. who were also the reigning champions of the I-League. Singh then made his Asian club international debut in the 2012 AFC Cup against Al-Oruba SC on 7 March 2012.

International
Singh has previously played for the India U15 and India U17 teams.

References

Indian footballers
1990 births
Living people
Sportspeople from Gurdaspur district
Footballers from Punjab, India
I-League players
Salgaocar FC players
India youth international footballers
Association football midfielders